Orson Flagg Bullard (June 18, 1834 - July 19, 1906) was an American politician from Pennsylvania who served as a Republican member of the Pennsylvania House of Representatives for Delaware County from 1873 to 1875 and from 1877 to 1878.  He was expelled from the Pennsylvania House of Representatives for embezzlement and escaping the custody of the sergeant-at-arms of the House.

Early life and education
Bullard was born in Bridgewater Township, Pennsylvania, he attended public schools and completed his education at the academy  at Montrose.

In 1863, Bullard enlisted in Company C of the 29th Pennsylvania Volunteer Infantry and served as a sergeant.  He participated in several skirmishes around the Battle of Gettysburg during the American Civil War.

In 1855, Bullard began studying law under John Martin Broomall.  He also worked as a principal of a boys' grammar school in Chester, Pennsylvania but quit after one year to study law full time.  In 1859, he was admitted to the Delaware County bar and in 1874 to the Philadelphia bar and to practice in the Pennsylvania Supreme Court.

Career
He served as clerk for the office of the Prothonotary, Delaware County from 1862 to 1865 and was elected Prothonotary and Clerk of Courts for Delaware County from 1866-1871.  Bullard was also elected school director for Media, Pennsylvania and served for 2 years.

Bullard was elected to the Pennsylvania House of Representatives for Delaware County for the 1873, 1877 and 1878 terms.  He was not a candidate for reelection to the House for the 1874 term.

Bullard was charged with embezzlement of funds from the Media Gas Company where he served as secretary.  He was expelled from the House on March 7, 1878 for embezzlement and escaping the custody of the sergeant-at-arms of the House.

Personal life
In 1859, Bullard married Rebecca A. Huston and together they had nine children.  Their son, William H.G. Bullard was an admiral in the United States Navy who served in the Spanish American War and World War I.

He was a member of the Beradburg Post No. 149, Grand Army of the Republic in Media, Pennsylvania.

Bullard died in Hackensack, New Jersey and is interred at the Media Cemetery in Upper Providence Township, Delaware County, Pennsylvania.

References

|-

1834 births
1906 deaths
19th-century American politicians
Burials at Media Cemetery
Republican Party members of the Pennsylvania House of Representatives
Pennsylvania lawyers
Pennsylvania politicians convicted of crimes
Pennsylvania prothonotaries
People from Media, Pennsylvania
People of Pennsylvania in the American Civil War